Coleman Branch is a stream off of Duck River in Hickman County, Tennessee, in the United States.

History
Coleman Branch was named for a pioneer who settled there before 1830.

See also
List of rivers of Tennessee

References

Rivers of Hickman County, Tennessee
Rivers of Tennessee